Synthetic genetic array analysis (SGA) is a high-throughput technique for exploring synthetic lethal and synthetic sick genetic interactions (SSL). SGA allows for the systematic construction of double mutants using a combination of recombinant genetic techniques, mating and selection steps. Using SGA methodology a query gene deletion mutant can be crossed to an entire genome deletion set to identify any SSL interactions, yielding functional information of the query gene and the genes it interacts with. A large-scale application of SGA in which ~130 query genes were crossed to the set of ~5000 viable deletion mutants in yeast revealed a genetic network containing ~1000 genes and ~4000 SSL interactions. The results of this study showed that genes with similar function tend to interact with one another and genes with similar patterns of genetic interactions often encode products that tend to work in the same pathway or complex. Synthetic Genetic Array analysis was initially developed using the model organism S. cerevisiae.  This method has since been extended to cover 30% of the S. cerevisiae genome. Methodology has since been developed to allow SGA analysis in S.pombe and  E. coli.

Background
Synthetic genetic array analysis was initially developed by Tong et al. in 2001 and has since been used by many groups working in a wide range of biomedical fields. SGA utilizes the entire genome yeast knock-out set created by the yeast genome deletion project.

Procedure
Synthetic genetic array analysis is generally conducted using colony arrays on petriplates at standard densities (96, 384, 768, 1536). To perform a SGA analysis in S.cerevisiae, the query gene deletion is crossed systematically with a deletion mutant array (DMA) containing every viable knockout ORF of the yeast genome (currently 4786 strains).  The resulting diploids are then sporulated by transferring to a media containing reduced nitrogen. The haploid progeny are then put through a series of selection platings and incubations to select for double mutants. The double mutants are screened for SSL interactions visually or using imaging software by assessing the size of the resulting colonies.

Robotics
Due to the large number of precise replication steps in SGA analysis, robots are widely used to perform the colony manipulations. There are a few systems specifically designed for SGA analysis, which greatly decrease the time to analyse a query gene. Generally these have a series of pins which are used to transfer cells to and from plates, with one system utilizing disposable pads of pins to eliminate washing cycles. Computer programs can be used to analyze the colony sizes from images of the plates thus automating the SGA scoring and chemical-genetics profiling.

Step for a yeast high content genome-wide genetic screening system(SGA -road map) 
There are six major components

 Mutant collection
 Material and tools for handling the mutants 
 Image analysis system
 Automatic quantification and scoring system
 Confirmation approaches
 Data analysis tools

 Mutant collection

The first step is to collect the mutants and create a mutants library either in solid or liquid media. Solid media could be better because it could save lots of time. At Early stage, mutant creation was done by homologous recombination method. We have an excellent mutant library for Saccharomyces cerevisiae, a well-studied model organism.

However, if you are trying for new, yeast model, you could have to either a genome sequencing and can predict the possible ORF by the good reference yeast genome(For example: with Saccharomyces cerevisiae). Consider a special case: If you don't have a reference genome, you should go for transcriptome and genome analysis of that new model organism.

 Material and tools for handling the mutantsOnce you have your mutant library in solid media. If mutants are in solid media, we have arranged the mutants with 1:3 ration, i.e. for one wild type to 3 mutants array(why? Wild type works as an internal control and in a solid media nutrient should not be shared equally for avoiding bias). Once you have single gene deleted mutants, you can start the tools for handling the mutants. In SGA it is referred to as “ Pinning”. ROTOR-HAD versions(referred as pinning robot) used for pinning the yeast mutants. This machine installed with a user-friendly interface which helps to pin the samples from sources plates to experimental plates

Image analysis system
 Automatic quantification and scoring system
 Confirmation approaches
 Data analysis tools

Mutant collection

See also
Tetrad (genetics)
Yeast two-hybrid
Synthetic lethality
Synthetic viability

References

Genetics
Microarrays